Ross McKinnon (1914-1962) was an Australian rugby league footballer and coach. Born in Oberon, New South Wales, he played for the University, Eastern Suburbs, New South Wales and for the Australian national side.

Playing career
He then joined Eastern Suburbs and played with them for four seasons between 1935 and 1938, and won two premierships with them in 1935 and 1937.

McKinnon was selected to go on the 1937-38 Kangaroo tour. He is listed on the Australian Players Register as Kangaroo No. 195.

After McKinnon finished playing in Australia's major rugby league competition - the NSWRL he moved to the more rural locality of Cessnock, New South Wales where the Centre played out the remainder of his career as the captain coach of that side. He took them to a Newcastle Rugby League's grand final victory in 1941.

Post playing
McKinnon later returned to Sydney and coached Canterbury-Bankstown, taking them to the play-offs in 1946 and in 1947 to the Grand final. He also coached North Sydney in 1952, 1953 and 1959.

In 1962, at the age of 48, following an operation on a brain tumor he died of coronary occlusion.

Although he was married twice, McKinnon was never able to have children due to injuries.

References

1914 births
1962 deaths
Australia national rugby league team players
Australian rugby league coaches
Australian rugby league players
Canterbury-Bankstown Bulldogs coaches
Cessnock Goannas players
City New South Wales rugby league team players
Country New South Wales rugby league team players
New South Wales rugby league team players
North Sydney Bears coaches
Rugby league centres
Rugby league five-eighths
Rugby league players from New South Wales
Sydney Roosters players
Sydney University rugby league team players